Tityus pococki is a species of scorpion belonging to the family Buthidae.

Distribution
This species is present in South America.

References

 Leonardo De Sousa, Jesús Manzanilla & Pedro Parrilla-Álvarez Nueva especie de Tityus (Scorpiones: Buthidae) del Turimiquire, Venezuela Rev. biol. trop vol.54 n.2 San José Jun. 2006
 Hirst, 1907 Notes on scorpions, with descriptions of two new species Annals and Magazine of Natural History, ser. 7, vol. 19, p. 208-211

pococki
Animals described in 1907
Scorpions of South America